Mashayekh may refer to:
 Mashayekh, East Azerbaijan
 Mashayekh, Kazerun, Fars Province
 Mashayekh, Mamasani, Fars Province
 Mashayekh Rural District (disambiguation)